Karishmaa is a 1984 Hindi language crime thriller film directed by I. V. Sasi, it stars Kamal Haasan, Reena Roy, Tina Munim, Danny Denzongpa, along with Raza Murad, Swaroop Sampat, Jagdeep, Sarika. The music was composed by R. D. Burman.

In this film Kamal Haasan plays the role of a photographer, Danny Denzongpa plays the character of a notorious criminal and Reena Roy acts as Kamal Haasan character's girlfriend.

It is a remake of Bharathiraja's Tamil film Tik Tik Tik (1981) that also starred Kamal Haasan in the same role.

Cast 

Kamal Haasan as Sunny
Reena Roy as Nisha 
Tina Munim as Radha 
Danny Denzongpa as Raja Sahib
Swaroop Sampat as Sapna
Jagdeep as Thakkar
Sarika as Neeta (Guest Appearance)
Mahesh Anand as Dev (Guest Appearance)
Satyen Kappu as Nisha's Father 
Shammi as Nisha's Mother
Kamal Kapoor as Singh  Directorate Supritendent of Police
Raza Murad as Anand
Mac Mohan as Mac
Viju Khote as Birju
Manik Irani as Jaggu
C. S. Dubey
Dulari as Radha's Mother 
Kirti kumar
Manmauji
Sunil Dhawan as Police Inspector

Soundtrack

References

External links 
 

1984 films
1980s Hindi-language films
Films scored by R. D. Burman
Hindi remakes of Tamil films
Films directed by I. V. Sasi